Louis Bertorelle (5 August 1932 – 27 February 2012) was a French basketball player. He was inducted into the French Basketball Hall of Fame, in 2008.

French national team
Bertorelle played at the 1960 Summer Olympic Games, with the senior French national basketball team.

References

External links
 

1932 births
2012 deaths
French men's basketball players
Olympic basketball players of France
Basketball players at the 1960 Summer Olympics
Sportspeople from Tarn (department)
Small forwards
CEP Lorient players
1954 FIBA World Championship players